Below is a partial list of shows that were previously aired on the Philippine television networks QTV, Q, GMA News TV and GTV. For the currently aired shows on GTV, see List of programs broadcast by GTV (Philippine TV network).

Former original programming
Note: Titles are listed in alphabetical order followed by the year of debut in parentheses.

News
 Balitanghali Weekend 
 Balita Pilipinas Ngayon 
 Balita Pilipinas Primetime 
 Boses ng Balita 
 Bigtime Balita 
 Buena Manong Balita 
 Dobol A sa Dobol B 
 Dobol B sa News TV 
 Dobol B: Bantay Balita sa Kamara 
 Dobol B: Bantay Balita sa Senado 
 DZBB Executive Summary 
 Citynet Morning News 
 Citynet Noontime/Afternoon News 
 Citynet Evening News 
 Citynet Late-Night News 
 Citynet Television News 
 Citynet Weekend News 
 Flash Report sa QTV 
 Flash Report sa Q 
 GMA Regional TV Weekend News 
 IM Ready sa Dobol B 
 In the Limelight 
 Kape at Balita 
 Kay Susan Tayo sa Super Radyo DZBB 
 Live on Q 
 Liwanag sa Balita 
 News on Q 
 News to Go 
 News TV Live 
 News TV Quick Response Team 
 On Call: Serbisyong Totoo. Ngayon. 
 Regional TV Weekend News 
 Review Philippines 
 SOS: Serbisyo on the Spot 
 State of the Nation with Jessica Soho 
 Super Balita sa Hapon 
 Super Balita sa Tanghali Nationwide 
 Super Radyo Nationwide

Drama
 Bayan Ko 
 Dahil sa Iyong Paglisan 
 Kapag nasa Katwiran, Ipaglaban Mo! 
 The Lost Recipe 
 My Guardian Abby 
 My Fantastic Pag-ibig 
 Noel 
 Posh 
 Project Destination 
 Titser 
 Wagas

Comedy
 Ay, Robot! 
 Camera Cafe 
 Family Zoo 
 Ganda ng Lola Ko 
 H3O: Ha Ha Ha Over 
 I Laugh Sabado 
 Laugh to Laugh: Ang Kulit! 
 May Tamang Balita 
 O Mare Ko 
 Project 11 
 TOLS

Talk
 Bawal ang Pasaway kay Mareng Winnie  
 Full Time Moms 
 Gabe Me a Break 
 The Gud Nite Show 
 Love Hotline 
 Mars 
 Moms 
 Newsmakers 
 Personalan: Ang Unang Hakbang 
 Power House 
 The Ricky Lo Exclusives 
 Showbiz Exclusives 
 The Sobrang Gud Nite Show with Jojo A All the Way! 
 Tonight with Arnold Clavio 
 Tweetbiz: The Bizniz of Chizmiz 
 Tweetbiz Insiders

Game
 Game of the Gens 
 Iba Na ang Matalino: The Nutroplex Brain Challenge 
 Now Na! 
 Takeshi's Castle

Reality
 Day Off 
 Fam Jam 
 Follow the Star 
 Here Comes the Bride 
 I-Shine Talent Camp TV 
 Popstar Kids 
 Show Ko! 
 The Smiths 
 Stars on Ice

Documentary / magazine
 Bongga Ka Star 
 Chances Are 
 DoQmentaries 
 Front Row 
 I-Witness 
 Investigative Documentaries 
 Misteryo 
 Motorcycle Diaries 
 Na-Scam Ka Na Ba? 
 On Record 
 One Proud Mama 
 Proudly Filipina 
 Pusong Wagi 
 Reel Time 
 Reporter's Notebook 
 Stories of Hope 
 True Stories 
 Tunay na Buhay 
 Weekend Getaway

Public affairs
 Adyenda 
 Alisto 
 Diyos at Bayan 
 Draw the Line 
 Shout Out: Sigaw ng Kabataan! 
 Talking Points with Rose Solangon 
 Women's Desk

Informative
 At Your Service-Star Power 
 The Awesome Life 
 Balikbayan 
 The Beat 
 Best Men 
 Boarding Pass 
 Bright Side 
 Candies 
 Chef to Go 
 Daddy-licious 
 Del Monte Kitchenomics 
 Delicioso 
 Everyday Easy 
 Fans Kita 
 Fit & Fab 
 Fil It Up with Mig Ayesa and Sophie Sumner 
 Family Time 
 Fashbook 
 Fashionistas by Heart 
 Filipknow 
 Gandang Ricky Reyes 
 Glow Up 
 Hamon ng Kalikasan 
 Happy Life 
 Hashtag Pinoy 
 Healthcetera with Dr. Manny and Dra. Pie Calayan 
 Healthy Cravings 
 The Healthy Life 
 Hired! 
 Home Work 
 I Love Pinas 
 Idol sa Kusina 
 IRL 
 Ka-Toque: Lutong Barkada 
 Life and Style With Ricky Reyes 
 Liga ng Kababaihan 
 Living It Up 
 Lovelife 
 Masigasig 
 My Favorite Recipes 
 Miya 
 Nancy Lumen: The Pinoy Foodie 
 OrganiqueTV 
 Pera Paraan 
 Ang Pinaka 
 Pisobilities 
 Pop Talk 
 Power Review 
 Q Tube 
 Q-Lets and Co. 
 Quickfire: 10-minute Kitchen Wonders 
 Reunions 
 Road Trip 
 RX Men 
 Sarap at Home 
 Sarap with Family 
 Siyensikat 
 Sus Naman! 
 The Sweet Life 
 Tara! Lets Eat! 
 Taste Buddies 
 Tiny Kitchen 
 True Confections 
 Tripinas 
 Tropang Potchi 
 Turbo Zone, Feed Your Drive! 
 Taste Buddies 
 TWGRR: D'World of Gandang Ricky Reyes 
 Ugaling Wagi 
 Vintage Trip 
 The Working Class 
 World-Class Kababayan 
 X-Life

Kid-oriented
 Just 4 Kids 
 Kids HQ 
 Kids on Q 
 Planet Q

Variety
 Flex 
 JAM 
 Let's Get Aww!!! 
 MINT: Music Interactive 
 MMS: My Music Station 
 This Is My Story, This Is My Song

Sports
 Game! 
 News TV All Sports 
 Philippine Secondary Schools Basketball Championship: Battle of Champions 
 Shakey's V-League 
 Sports Pilipinas 
 TKO: Tanghali Knockouts: Matira Matibay (2013–2014) 
 Who's Next? Pro-Boxing Series

Others
 Armor of God 
 Baywalk 
 Be Alive 
 Bluffing with Paolo and Bodie 
 Dare Duo 
 The Debutante 
 Design Para sa Lahat 
 Dishkarte of the Day 
 The Dr. Tess Show 
 Events Incorporated 
 The Final Cut 
 Ginang Fashionista 
 Groupee TV 
 Hapinas 
 Hayop Atbp. 
 Hollywood Boot Camp 
 Home Base 
 Last Woman Standing 
 Life Rocks 
 Luv U Pet with Jamie Fournier and Lestre Zapanta 
 Mga Waging Kuwento ng OFW 
 Michelle Simone's Entertains 
 Mommy Diary 
 Mommy Elvie at 18
 Music Bank 
 MyHouse Today 
 Nang Magising si Juan 
 Philippine Explorer 
 Puso Mo sa Amerika 
 Remix Report 
 Ripley's Believe It or Not
 Running Man 
 RunnerSpeak 
 Sarap to Heart 
 Say Mo Doc 
 SME GO! Powered by Go Negosyo 
 Smile TV 
 Weddings TV 
 Word of Mouth 
 You Women

Specials
2010 MMFF Parade (December 24, 2010)
20th Asian TV Awards (December 5, 2015)
Ageless Passion: Justice Artemio Pangaiban’s 75th Birthday TV Special (January 22, 2012)
Anak ng Bayan: Katipunan Primer (October 25, 2013)
Ang Kasagutan (produced by Billy Graham Evangelistic Association) (December 2006)
Bongga Ka Star Grand Finals (August 27, 2006)
Citynet Television: First Anniversary Special (August 31, 1996)
Divine Wedding Dresses with the Knot (June 29, 2009)
Eddie Romero's Dangal: Father's Day Drama Special (June 2010)
Eleksyon: The GMA Election Coverage (2007, 2010, 2013, 2016, 2019, 2022)
Experience GMA Today & Beyond: 58 Glorious Years of Television (November 2, 2008)
Fam Jam Grand Finals (2006)
Idols on Q: Featuring the American Idols and finalists (May 17 and 23, 2009)
I-Shine Talent Camp TV Grand Finals (June 2012)
Inno Sotto: A Special Fashion Documentary (April 5 and 6, 2008)
Just for Laughs Anniversary Special (January 6 and 7, 2010)
Last Woman Standing Grand Finals (2008)
Mga Kuwentong Pambata Ni Rizal (June 19, 2011) 
Miss Global Philippines 2014 (November 23, 2014)
Miss Republic of the Philippines 2015 (November 23, 2015)
Miss Tourism Philippines 2015 (August 9, 2015)
Motorcycle Diaries ASEAN Expedition Documentary Special (July 8, 2012)
Mrs. Universe Beauty Pageant (November 29, 2009)
Ms. QC Diamond Jubilee (October 12, 2014)
Pinay Beauty Queen Academy Season 1 Grand Finals (December 27, 2014)
Pinay Beauty Queen Academy Season 2 Grand Finals (September 19 and 20, 2015)
Pluma: Rizal, Ang Dakilang Manunulat (June 19, 2011) 
Pop Star Kids Grand Finals Showdown (September 17, 2006, and July 29, 2007)
The Pursuit of Style: A Young Designer's Special (April 25 & 26, 2009)
RH Bill: The Grand Debate (2011)
Ron Mariano: Salamangkero (October 10, 2010)
Sa Ngalan Ng Anak: A CBN Holy Week Special (March 2007)
San Pedro Calungsod: A GMA News TV Docu Drama Special (October 21, 2012)
The Score  (produced by Billy Graham Evangelistic Association) (December 2006)
SM Little Stars (October 2009)
Stealing Minds (July 5, 2007)
Sutasi: The Search Begins (July and August 2009)
Tanikala: CBN Asia Holy Week Special (March 2009)
Thou Shalt Not Blink (2008)
Women's World Awards (2006)

2019 Southeast Asian Games: Closing Ceremony (December 11, 2019)
Gabi ng Pagpupugay: 100 Taon ng Philippine Sports (August 10, 2014)
Laban ng Lahi: Donnie Nietes vs. Mario Rodriguez Fight (August 6, 2011)
Laban ng Lahi: Johnreil Casimero vs. Raul Hirales Fight (July 25, 2010)
Manila Invitational Cup 2010 Basketball Finals (June 26–29, 2010)
ONE Championship: Valor of Champions (August 2015)
Pride & Glory: The Sonsona-Hernandez Fight (November 22, 2009)
1st Shakey's V League All Star Weekend (December 1, 2013)
Shakey's V-League Season 11 First Conference Finals: NU Lady Bulldogs vs. FEU Lady Tamaraws/Bronze Medal Match: Adamson Lady Falcon vs. UST Golden Tigresses (March 22, 23 and 25, 2014)
Shakey's V-League Season 11 Open Conference Finals: Cagayan Valley Lady Rising Suns vs. Philippine Army Lady Troppers/Bronze Medal Match: PLDT Home Telpad Turbo Boosters vs. Philippine Air Force air Spikers1 (August 29 and 31, 2014)
Shakey's V-League Season 11 Reinforced Conference Women's Division Finals: Philippine Army vs. Cagayan Valley/Men's Division Finals: Systema vs. IEM1 (November 4, 5 and 9, 2014)
Shakey's V-League Season 12 Open Conference Opening Games1 (April 5, 6 and 7, 2015)
Shakey's V-League Season 12 Open Conference Finals: Philippine Army vs. PLDT Home Ultera (May 23, 24 and 31, 2015)
Shakey's V-League Season 12 Open Conference Bronze Medal Match: Cagayan Valley Lady Rising Suns vs. Meralco Power Spikers (May 25 and 26, 2015)
Shakey's V-League Season 12 Collegiate Conference Battle for Third: UST Golden Tigresses vs. FEU Lady Tamaraws (September 19 and 26, 2015)
Team Pilipinas In Australia Sports Special (May 15 and 22, 2010)
Team Pilipinas In Jones Cup Sports Special (August 1, 2010)
URCC 25: Domination (August 16, 2015)

#TB2014: Throwback 2014 (The GMA News and Public Affairs Year-end Special) (December 28, 2014)
20 Istorya: Dalawpung Taon ng GMA Public Affairs (2007)
300 Kilometers Ang Paglalakbay  (May 29, 2011)
Ako si Ninoy (August 24, 2013)
Always Whitney (January 5, 2014)
Awit ng Pasko: A Musical Documentary (December 14, 2013)
Bond Cocktail (March 30, 2014)
Bond Girls Are Forever (March 30, 2014)
Cory Aquino: The Housewife Who led a Revolution (February 2012)
The Day Kennedy Died: John F. Kennedy Assassination Documentary Special (November 22, 2013)
Eats More Fun: Desserts (2012)
Eats More Fun in the Philippines (2012)
Ground Zero (2011)
Imbestigador: Bantay: Kaban ng Bayan (September 21, 2013)
Imelda (October 5, 2014)
Inside Malacañang: A National Geographic Channel Documentary (June 30, 2012)
Inside the Titanic (November 10, 2013)
It's Good to Be a President (2012)
Kalam: Usapin ng Seguridad sa Pagkain (2008)
Limang Dekada: The GMA News 50th Anniversary Special (January 31, 2010)
Look Up, Look Up: 2013 GMA News and Public Affairs Yearend Review (January 4, 2014)
Marcos: The Downfall of a Dictator (February 2012)
NCAA Philippines (2021)
Nelson Mandela: One Man (December 20, 2013)
PDu30 @ 100 (October 10, 2016)
PiliPinas Debates 2016 – Mindanao leg (February 21, 2016)
Prince George of Cambridge: Born to Reign (December 21, 2013)
Relationship Status: Single (August 28, 2011)
Signos: Ang Banta ng Bagong Klima (2008)
Sisid (2008)
Summer Sarap (2009)
Team Pacquiao (2009)
Thriller in Manila: The Documentary (September 30, 2012)
Thriller in Manila: The Historic Bout (October 6, 2012)
Travel: More fun in the Philippines (March 31, 2012)
Votebook (2010)
Walang Pera? (2009)
Wildlife for Sale (2010)

Informercials
 EZ Shop 
 Shop Japan 
 Shop TV

Film and special presentation
 Asian Horror Stories 
 Cinema Klasika 
 Ginintuang Telon 
 Rated: Chick Flicks 
 Sabado Showdown 
 Saturday Cinema Hits 
 Sine Sabado 
 Sunday Super Sine 
 Takilya Blockbusters 
 The Big Picture 
 True Horror Stories

Religious
 The 700 Club Asia 
 Eucharistia: Pananalangin at Pag-aaral 
 Jesus the Healer 
 Life Giver 
 Light Up 
 River of Worship 
 Midnight Prayer Helps 
 PJM Forum 
 Worship Word & Wonders

Former acquired programming
Note: Titles are listed in alphabetical order followed by the year of debut in parentheses.

Animated
Absolute Boy
The Adventures of Hello Kitty & Friends
Ah! My Goddess
Alice's Adventures in Wonderland
AM Driver
Angel's Friends
Angie Girl (2006–2007)
Angry Birds Blues
Angry Birds Makerspace
Angry Birds Stella
Anne of Green Gables
Aria
Astro Boy
Atashin'chi
Bakugan Battle Brawlers
Bannertail
Battle B-Daman
Ben 10: Alien Force
Ben 10: Ultimate Alien
BB-Daman Bakugaiden
Bleach
Blue's Clues (2005–2006)
Burst Angel
The Bush Baby
Camp Lazlo (2008–2010)
Cardcaptor Sakura
Charlotte
Cheeky Angel
Chōdenji Robo Combattler V (2007–2008)
Christmas Cartoon Festival Presents
Cinderella 
D.N.Angel
Detective Conan
Dinofroz
Dog of Flanders
Dogtanian
Dragon Tales (2006–2009)
Dragon Ball
Dragon Ball Z
Elementar Gerad
Extreme Ghostbusters
Fairy Tail
Flame of Recca
Foster's Home for Imaginary Friends (2008–2010)
Final Fantasy: Unlimited (2007–2008)
Future GPX Cyber Formula
Galaxy Adventures of Oz
Galaxy Angel
Ghost Fighter
Gransazers
Grimm's Fairy Tales
Hamtaro
Haruka
Hayate the Combat Butler
Heidi
Hello! Lady Lynn
Hikaru no Go
Honey Honey
Hunter × Hunter
Idaten Jump
Initial D
Ironman 28
Jackie Chan Adventures
Jackie and Jill
Johan: The Young Scientist (2010)
Jeanie with the Light Brown Hair
The Jungle Book
Justirisers
Kaleido Star
The Karate Kid
Kiddy Grade
Kirby
Kiteretsu
Knockout
Kuma no Ko Jacky (Jackie & Jill)
Lady Lady
Lalabel, The Magical Girl
Last Exile
Legend of the Dragon
Love Hina
Lulu The Flower Angel
Maid Sama!
Mirmo!
Make Way for Noddy
Marco
Martin Mystery
Men In Black
Moby Dick
Monster Buster Club
My Daddy Long Legs
Marcelino Pan y Vino (TV series) (2005–2010)
My Gym Partner's a Monkey (2008–2010)
My Little Pony and Friends
My Melody
Olympus Guardian
Otogi Zoshi
Outlaw Star
Ozu no Mahōtsukai
Pac-Man and the Ghostly Adventures
Pani Poni Dash!
Peacemaker Kurogane
Peach Girl
Perrine
Pichi Pichi Pitch
Piggy Tales: Third Act
Piggy Tales: 4th Street
Pokémon the Series: XYZ
Pokémon the Series: Sun & Moon
Poochini
Popolocrois
The Powerpuff Girls (2008–2010)
Prince Mackaroo
The Prince of Tennis
Prudence Investigations
Puppy in My Pocket: Adventures In Pocketville
Rascal
Rockman Axess
Sabrina: The Animated Series
Sabrina's Secret Life
Samurai X
Scrapped Princess
SD Gundam Force
Shugo Chara
Sinbad the Sailor
Shaman King
Simba the King Lion
Sky Dancers
Slam Dunk
The Snow Queen
Sonic X
Sorcerer Orphen Revenge
SpongeBob SquarePants (2010-2011)
Striker Hungry Heart
Sugar: A Little Snow Fairy
Sugar Sugar Rune
Tactics
Team Galaxy
Those Who Hunt Elves
Tom & Jerry Kids
Toriko
The Tom and Jerry Show
Tom and Jerry Tales
Tomorrow's Nadja
Transformers Animated
Transformers: Armada
Transformers Beast Machines
The Trapp Family
Tsubasa Chronicle
The Twelve Kingdoms
Twin Princesses of Wonder Planet
Ultimate Book of Spells
Twin Spica 
Vision of Escaflowne
Wonderballs!
World's Famous Tales
YAWARA!: A Fashionable Judo Girl!
Yo-Kai Watch
Yo-Kai Watch: Shadowside
Yucie
Yu-Gi-Oh!
Zentrix
Zipang

Drama
 A Rosy Life
 All For Love
 All In
 Alone in Love
 All About Eve
 April Kiss
Batman
 Beethoven Virus
 Bodyguard
 Boys Over Flowers
 Birth of a Beauty
 Bong Dal-Hee, The Surgeon
 Bride of the Water God
 Bright Girl
 Celebrity Sweethearts
 Cinderella and the Four Knights
 Coffee Prince
 Cheese in the Trap
 Dal-ja's Spring
 Damo
 Dong Yi
Drop Dead Diva
 Emperor of the Sea
 Empress Ki
 Endless Love
 Extraordinary You
 Fashion 70's
 Fireworks
 Fly High
 Foxy Lady
 Full House
 Future's Choice
 Glass Slippers
 Golden Apple
 The Good Manager
 Guardian Angel
H2O: Just Add Water
 Hearts of 19
 Hit the Top
 Hello God
 Hong Kong Express
 Hotelier
House M.D.
 House Husband
 I Do, I Do
 Into the World Again
 Irene
Joan of Arcadia
 King of Ambition
 La Doña 
 Legendary Women
Lois & Clark
 Love Actually
 Love in Heaven
 Love Story in Harvard
 Love Truly
 Lovers in Prague
 The Magicians of Love
 Mamaw-in-Law
 Man X Man
 Marrying My Daughter Twice
 Meteor Garden
 Meteor Garden II
 Meteor Rain
Model
 Moon Embracing the Sun
 Mouse Loves Rice
 My Absolute Boyfriend
 Mirror of the Witch
 Miss Kim's Million Dollar Quest
 Money War
 My Name Is Kim Sam Soon
 My 19 Year Old Sister-in-Law
 My Sassy Girl
 New Heart
 Night after Night
 Oh My Ghost
 On Air
 One Fine Day
 Over the Greenfields
 Phoenix
 Pinocchio1
 Powerful Opponents
 Pretty Woman
 Prime Minister and I
 Reply 1997
Rosalinda
 Saimdang: Soulmates Across Time
 Sad Love Song
 Secret Garden
 Secret Hotel
 Secret Love
 Single Again
 Sorry, I Love You
 Stairway to Heaven
Street Fighter: Assassin's Fist 
 Summer Beach
 Super Rookie
 Sweet Spy
 Temptation
 Thank You
 The Maid
 The Liar and His Lover
 The Love Knot
 The Master's Sun
 The Producers
 Tree of Heaven
 Two Mothers
 Two Spirits' Love
 Typhoon in That Summer
 Where Stars Land
 When a Snail Falls in Love
 Wish Upon A Star
 Women in the Sun
Wonder Woman
 Worlds Within

 Jewel in the Palace
 Jumong
 Land of Wind
 Queen Seondeok
 Song of the Prince
 The Legend

 Chibi Maruko-chan
 Hana Kimi Japan
 Hana Yori Dango
 Hana Yori Dango 2
 Love Generation
 Nobuta wo Produce
 Operation Love
 Summer Snow
 Love O2O
Hidden Love
 Nakee
 You're My Destiny
 Secret Seven
 Secret Love Online
 Princess Hours (Thai version)
 Fall in Love with Me
 Lavender
 My MVP Valentine
 Prince of Wolf
 Reaching for the Stars
Amanda O
Cabecita
Camila
Endless Christmas
Ka Ina
Mariana
Marina
Mr. and Mrs. Pells
Sítio do Picapau Amarelo

Reality
American Idol (2008-2011)
Amnesia
Are You Smarter Than A Fifth Grader? (2007-2009)
Asia's Next Top Model
The Cut
Guess Who's Coming to Decorate
 Iron Chef
 Kings of Restoration 
Lip Sync Battle 
Mansions
My Celebrity Home
My Dad Is Better Than Your Dad
 Pawn Stars 
Power of 10
Stylista
Survivor: Gabon
Survivor: Philippines
Survivor: Tocantins

Comedy
 Just For Laughs Gags
 Just Kidding 
 The Planet's Funniest Animals

Informative
Ancient Aliens (2016)
Biography (2012)
The Blue Planet (2012)
Confidentials
Dr. Phil
Earthflight (2013)
Great Migrations (2014)
Human Planet (2013)
Life in the Undergrowth (2012)
Mankind The Story of All of Us (2013)
Planet Earth (2012)
Planet Earth II (2020)
Planet's Funniest Animals
Prehistoric Park
Serial Killer Earth (2016)
Sport Science (2015)
Stan Lee's Superhumans (2013)
Top 20 Funniest (2016)
Wild Case Files (2013)

Dining in Style
Are you Dressed?
E! Countdown Collection:
E! Sexiest Countdown Series
Fashion Police
High Maintenance 90210
Homes with Style
How Do I Look?
My Celebrity Home
Mysteries & Scandals
Relationship Rehab
Shabby Chic
Shopaholic 911

Game
Bert's Family Feud

References

Q
GMA News TV
Philippine television-related lists